The Xiao River is the Main Stream of the upper Xiang River located in Yongzhou, Hunan.

Geography
The Xiao River borders to the south by the Mengzhu Mountains and Gui River of Xi River tributary, to the east by Yangming Mountains (阳明山), Chongling River and Lianjiang River of Bei River tributary, to the west by the Dupang Mountains. The tributaries of the Xiao reach Lianzhou of Guangdong and Guangxi. Originating from the southern side of Yegou Mountain (野狗岭) in Zhulin Village (竹林村) of Xiangjiangyuan Township, Lanshan County, the Xiao River flows southwest to northeast through Lanshan, Jianghua, Jiangyong, Ningyuan, Dao, Shuangpai, Lengshuitan and Lingling eight counties, joining the Main Stem of the Xiang at the confluence in Ping Island of Yongzhou with the West Branch from Guangxi.

See also
List of rivers in China
Xiaoxiang
Hunan

References